Chris Jenkins (born Christopher Robert Jenkins; 6 December 1987) is a Welsh actor. He grew up in Penarth, Vale of Glamorgan, Wales attending Stanwell School. He received his theatre training at Guildford School of Acting graduating in 2009.

In 2009, upon leaving training, Jenkins returned to his roots playing Demetrius in A Midsummer Night's Dream in a tour of Wales with Black Rat Productions. He then created the role of Bobby Duval in the world premiere of the Big Band Musical, Come Fly With Me at the Wales Millennium Centre with Mark Moraghan as Frank Simpson. Jenkins was then cast as Callum King in Super Alice Smith at Trafalgar Studios as part of Perfect Pitch Musicals' initiative to create new musical theatre. He spent Christmas 2009 with Henry Winkler and Les Dennis at the Liverpool Empire Theatre in First Family Entertainment's Peter Pan.

In 2010, Jenkins joined the company at the Royal Opera House performing as an actor in 3 operas; Verdi's Aida directed by David McVicar, Verdi's Simon Boccanegra starring Plácido Domingo and Charles Gounod's Roméo et Juliette where he was assistant fight captain.
To finish the year, Jenkins played Larry Foreman in Arcola Theatre's 10th Anniversary Production of The Cradle Will Rock. It was the last production at the Arcola Street location before moving to a new building opposite Dalston Junction Railway Station

In 2011, Jenkins appeared in Kneehigh Theatre’s The Umbrellas of Cherbourg at Gielgud Theatre, his West End debut. The production was directed by Emma Rice. It was given tryouts at Leicester's Curve Theatre from 11 to 26 February 2011 and began previews in the West End at the Gielgud Theatre where Jenkins joined as Swing/Ensemble. The production began on 5 March, officially opening on 22 March. It was due to run until October 2011, but closed in May 2011.

Jenkins appeared at the Barbican Centre and UK tour as Swing in the Lincoln Center's Tony Award winning production of South Pacific directed by Bartlett Sher. The production opened 15 August 2011.

In 2013-2014, Jenkins appeared in Spamalot at the Playhouse Theatre in the West End. Starring Stephen Tompkinson as King Arthur and Anna-Jane Casey as Lady of the Lake.

In 2014, Jenkins appeared in Billy Elliot on the West End in London. It closed on 9 April 2016, when the Victoria Palace Theatre closed for refurbishment.

He has been in a relationship with actor Daniel Boys, since 2014.

Recordings
 Chess in Concert CD (Warner Bros 2009)
 Chess in Concert DVD (Warner Music Entertainment 2009)

References

External links
 Arcola Theatre
 The Umbrellas of Cherbourg Official Site
 
 Chris Jenkins' Official Site

1987 births
Living people
Welsh male stage actors
People from Penarth